Yosra Alaa El Din (born 1986) is an Egyptian chess player who holds the title of Woman International Master (WIM, 2008).

In 2007, Yosra Alaa El Din won a bronze medal in the African Women's Chess Championship in Windhoek. For this success FIDE awarded her title of Woman International Master (WIM). She also won an individual gold medal playing for Egypt on board 1 at the 2007 All-Africa Games. In 2008, Yosra Alaa El Din participated in the Women's World Chess Championship in Nalchik, where she lost to Humpy Koneru in the first round. She played for Egypt at two Women's Chess Olympiads.

Since 2012 she has rarely participated in chess tournaments.

References

External links
 
 
 

1986 births
Living people
Egyptian female chess players
Chess Woman International Masters
Chess Olympiad competitors
Competitors at the 2007 All-Africa Games
African Games gold medalists for Egypt
African Games medalists in chess
21st-century Egyptian women